Skarskvervet Glacier is a small cirque-type glacier at the east side of Botnfjellet Mountain in the Humboldt Mountains of Queen Maud Land. Discovered and photographed by the German Antarctic Expedition, 1938–39. Mapped by Norway from air photos and surveys by Norwegian Antarctic Expedition, 1956–60, and named Skarskvervet.

See also
 List of glaciers in the Antarctic
 Glaciology

References
 

Glaciers of Queen Maud Land
Humboldt Mountains (Antarctica)